Kula, which translates as Tower from Serbo-Croatian, may refer to:

People
Bob Kula, American football player
Irwin Kula (born 1957), American rabbi and author
Karel Kula (born 1963), Czech footballer

Places

 Kula, Bihać, a village in Bosnia and Herzegovina
 Kula (Bugojno), a village in Bosnia and Herzegovina
 Kula, Busovača, a village in Bosnia and Herzegovina
 Kula (Konjic), a village in Bosnia and Herzegovina
 Kula (Sokolac), a village in Bosnia and Herzegovina
 Kula, Travnik, a village in Bosnia and Herzegovina
 Kula, Zenica, a village in Bosnia and Herzegovina
 Kula, Bulgaria, a town and municipality in Vidin Province, Bulgaria
 Kula, Croatia, a village in Požega-Slavonia County, Croatia
 Kula, Ethiopia, a town in Ethiopia
 Kula Eco Park, a zoological park near Sigatoka, Fiji
 Kula, Iran, a village in East Azerbaijan Province, Iran
 Kula, Serbia, a town and municipality in Vojvodina, Serbia
 Kula (volcano), a volcanic field in Turkey
 Kula, Manisa, a town in Western Anatolia, Turkey
 Kula, Hawaii, a district of East Maui in Hawaii, U.S.
 Kula, Sungurlu

Other uses
 Kula ring, a ceremonial exchange system in Papua New Guinea
 Kula (unit), an obsolete unit of measurement in India and Morocco
 Kula or Kaula (Hinduism), a Hindu religious tradition
 Kula people (Asia), an ethnic group in Thailand and Cambodia
 Kula tribe (Australia),  an indigenous Australian people of the state of New South Wales
 Kula tribe (Nigeria), a Nigerian tribe
 Kula, tower houses in the Balkans
 Kula Watermelon, a flavor of Bai Brands' Antioxidant Infusion

See also
 Kula Plate, an ancient oceanic plate, which began subducting under North America
 Kula-Farallon Ridge, an ancient mid-ocean ridge in the Pacific Ocean
 Kula Diamond, a character in the King of Fighters series
 KULA-LP, a radio station in American Samoa
 Kula Shaker, an English rock band
 Kula World, a platform video game

Language and nationality disambiguation pages